Orazio Brunetti  (born 1630) was an Italian engraver and painter, active mainly in Rome.

Biography
He was born in Siena and trained in Rome, following the style of François de Poilly. Among his engravings is a Sant'Agnese based on a design of Francesco Rustici. He also engraved a St Sebastian, St George slays the Dragon, Four Seasons, The Golden Age, The Prodigal Son, and a mythologic subject. A painting in San Nicola di Bari, Sestola is attributed to Brunetti.

References

1630 births
Year of death unknown
17th-century Italian painters
Italian male painters
Italian engravers
Painters from Siena